Whistling Hills is a 1951 American Western film directed by Derwin Abrahams and starring Johnny Mack Brown, James Ellison and Noel Neill.

The film's sets were designed by the art director Dave Milton.

Partial cast
 Johnny Mack Brown as Johnny Mack Brown  
 James Ellison as Sheriff Dave Holland  
 Noel Neill as Beth Fairchild  
 I. Stanford Jolley as Chet Norman  
 Marshall Reed as Roger Claine  
 Pamela Duncan as Waitress Cora 
 Lee Roberts as Henchman Slade  
 Pierce Lyden as Horse-Thief Cassidy  
 Bud Osborne as Stagecoach-Driver Pete

References

Bibliography
 Bernard A. Drew. Motion Picture Series and Sequels: A Reference Guide. Routledge, 2013.

External links
 

1951 films
1951 Western (genre) films
American Western (genre) films
Monogram Pictures films
Films scored by Raoul Kraushaar
American black-and-white films
Films directed by Derwin Abrahams
1950s English-language films
1950s American films